Duong Hong Phong (born 30 August 1953, Nam Dinh, Vietnam) is an American mathematician of Vietnamese origin.  He is a professor of mathematics at Columbia University. He is known for his research on complex analysis, partial differential equations, string theory and complex geometry.

Education and career
After graduating from Lycée Jean-Jacques Rousseau in Saigon, Phong attended a university year at the École Polytechnique Fédérale, Lausanne, Switzerland and then went to the United States as an undergraduate and then a graduate student at Princeton University.

In 1977, he defended his dissertation entitled "On Hölder and Lp Estimates for the Conjugate Partial Equation on Strongly Pseudo-Convex Domains" under the direction of Elias Stein.

For the academic year 1977–1978 Phong was a researcher at the Institute for Advanced Study in Princeton, New Jersey.

Recognition
In 1994 he was an Invited Speaker at the ICM in Zurich. He was the second Vietnamese to receive the honor (after Frédéric Pham).

In 2009 Phong was awarded the Stefan Bergman Prize for his research on the operators involved in the Neumann d-bar problem and on pseudo-differential operators.

He was named to the 2021 class of fellows of the American Mathematical Society "for contributions to analysis, geometry, and mathematical physics".

Selected publications
with C. Fefferman: On positivity of pseudo-differential operators. Proc Natl Acad Sci U S A. 1978 Oct; 75(10): 4673–4674. 
On integral representations for the Neumann operator. Proc Natl Acad Sci U S A. 1979 Apr; 76(4): 1554–1558. 
with C. Fefferman: On the lowest eigenvalue of a pseudo-differential operator. Proc Natl Acad Sci U S A. 1979 Dec; 76(12): 6055–6056. 
with C. Fefferman: On the asymptotic eigenvalue distribution of a pseudo-differential operator. Proc Natl Acad Sci U S A. 1980 Oct; 77(10): 5622–5625. 
with C. Fefferman: Symplectic geometry and positivity of pseudo-differential operators. Proc Natl Acad Sci U S A. 1982 Jan; 79(2): 710–713. 
with E. M. Stein: Singular integrals related to the Radon transform and boundary value problems. Proc Natl Acad Sci U S A. 1983 Dec; 80(24): 7697–7701. 
with E. M. Stein. "Hilbert integrals, singular integrals, and Radon transforms I." Acta Mathematica 157, no. 1 (1986): 99–157. 
with Eric D'Hoker: "The geometry of string perturbation theory." Reviews of Modern Physics 60, no. 4 (1988): 917 
with E. M. Stein: "The Newton polyhedron and oscillatory integral operators." Acta Mathematica 179, no. 1 (1997): 105–152. 
with Jacob Sturm: "Lectures on stability and constant scalar curvature." Current developments in mathematics 2007 (2009): 101–176. 
with Jacob Sturm: Regularity of geodesic rays and Monge-Ampère equations. Proc. Amer. Math. Soc. 138 (2010), 3637–3650. 
with Jian Song and Jacob Sturm: "Complex Monge Ampere Equations."  (2012).
with Pengfei Guan: Partial Legendre transforms of non-linear equations. Proc. Amer. Math. Soc. 140 (2012), 3831-3842.

References

External links

1953 births
Living people
20th-century Vietnamese mathematicians
Princeton University alumni
Columbia University faculty
Fellows of the American Mathematical Society
21st-century Vietnamese mathematicians